Mark Wilkes Collet (June 2, 1826 – May 3, 1863) was a Union Army officer who served during the American Civil War. He served as Colonel and commander of the 1st New Jersey Volunteer Infantry regiment, a unit he led from the Second Battle of Bull Run until the Chancellorsville Campaign. He was killed during his regiment's participation in the May 3, 1863, Battle of Salem Church during the campaign.

His remains were taken to Philadelphia, Pennsylvania, where they were buried in the churchyard of the Church of St. James the Less.

References
Baquet, Camille, "History of the First Brigade, New Jersey Volunteers (Kearny's First New Jersey Brigade) from 1861 to 1865", 1910.
Gottfried, Bradley M., "Kearny's Own: The History of the First New Jersey Brigade in the Civil War", Rutgers University Press, New Brunswick, September 2005.
Stryker, William S., "Record of Officers and Men of New Jersey in the Civil War 1861-1865", Trenton, New Jersey, 1876.

External links

People of New Jersey in the American Civil War
Union Army colonels
Union military personnel killed in the American Civil War
1826 births
1863 deaths
Burials at the Church of St. James the Less